Puntioplites falcifer is a species of ray-finned fish in the genus Puntioplites which is endemic to the Mekong basin in Thailand, Laos, Cambodia and Vietnam.

Footnotes 

 

Falcifer
Fish described in 1929